Callechelys randalli is an eel in the family Ophichthidae (worm/snake eels). It was described by John E. McCosker in 1998. It is a tropical, marine eel which is known from the Marquesan Islands, in the eastern central Pacific Ocean. It is known to inhabit sand at a depth of 35 metres. Males can reach a maximum total length of 46.4 centimetres.

References

Ophichthidae
Fish described in 1998
Fish of the Pacific Ocean